Paksi FC (Paks) is a Hungarian football club based in Paks. Since its founding in 1952, it has played at either a county or national level. In 2006, it ascended to Borsodi Liga, or NB I, the top division in Hungarian football, for the first time.  It plays its home games at Fehérvári úti Stadion. The team colors are green and white. In the 2010–11 Hungarian Division, the team finished second and qualified for the Europa League 2011–12 season.

History

Early years
Football first came to Paks in August 1912 with a team composed entirely of students. Soon thereafter the Paksi Atlétikai Sport Club was formed which played locally. In 1952, the Paksi Sportegyesület was formed and began competing at a county level in Tolna county. They would continue to compete in county level competitions from 1954 to 1964. In 1966, the team opened their new all grass playing field to a crowd of 500.

In 1970, the team won the county championship and ascended to NB III, in the central division. On July 25 of the same year, they hosted Ferencváros and although the team lost 7–2, it played before a crowd of 5,000. It would spend three more years in NB III before being relegated back to the county championship level.

1976 was the club's most impressive year in county play as it won the championship with an impressive goal difference of 119–21 and again returned to NB III, but this was not the end of its success. It would win the Szabadföld Kupa 4–2 at the Népstadion in Budapest, easily the team's greatest victory up to this point.

From 1981 to 1982, the team participated in the NB III Dráva group, but it was short-lived and team returned to county level play. In the 1983–84 season, however, they won the championship in convincing fashion and returned to NB III. Throughout the 1980s, the team would come close several times to breaking into NB II, often battling against the other team from Paks, ASE, but always fell a few pieces short.

In July 1993, the two teams, Paksi SE and ASE United, giving the young players of PSE opportunities to learn and grow by learning from the more experienced ASE side. In 2001, the team won the NB III Duna group as an unexpected black horse, and then in 2005–06 Nemzeti Bajnokság II season they would win the NB II Western division with 25 wins, 1 draw, 4 losses, with a point difference of 66–22, earning them their first berth in NB I.

Recent years

Paks' first season in NB I started with a 2–0 win against Dunakanyar-Vác FC – this was followed by three draws and a loss before their next win. Looking back at the season as it draws to a close, Paks was able to get strong wins at home against MTK Budapest and ZTE, teams who had spent most of their time atop the table. They won their final home game of the season 4–2 against Vasas, guaranteeing that they would not be relegated back to NB II, and staying in NB I for the 2007–08 season. In the 2010–11 Hungarian Division the team finished second and qualified for the Europa League 2011–12.
Paks played their first international match in the Europa League 2011–12 season in Andorra where they beat UE Santa Coloma 1–0. The only goal of the match came in the 14th minute when Gábor Vayer scored. At home, they debuted with a four-goal win in Videoton's stadium, the Sóstói Stadion. József Magasföldi scored twice, one in each half. Dániel Böde and Norbert Heffler also contributed to the result. In the second round Paks faced the Norwegian Tromsø at home in front of 1,800 spectators, again in the Sóstói Stadion, in Székesfehérvár. The first goal of the match was scored by Magnus Andersen, with an equaliser from Hungarian Gábor Vayer. The match finished 1–1. In the second leg in Norway at the Alfheim Stadion Tamás Kiss scored to give Paks the lead in the 59th minute. Two more goals by Dániel Böde and again Tamás Kiss on the night gave Paks a 4–1 aggregate win over Tromsø. In the third round Paks were drawn against Scottish club Hearts. In the first leg in Hungary, Paks took the lead in the 32nd minute with a stunning lobbed goal by István Sipeki. In stoppage time at the end of the first half, Finnish referee Mattias Gestranius awarded Hearts a soft penalty, which was scored by Jamie Hamill to equalise and end the scoring on the night at the Sóstói Stadion.

Paks were eliminated by Puskás Akadémia FC on 3–5 aggregate in the round of 16 of the 2018–19 Magyar Kupa season.

Stadium
The home of the club is the Fehérvári úti Stadion which is a multi-use stadium in Paks, Hungary. Its capacity is 5,001. In the Europa League 2011–12 season the club played their home ties in the neighbouring city Székesfehérvár at the Sóstói Stadion.

Colours, badge and nicknames
The colours of the club are green and white. This combination is one of the most popular in Hungary – many clubs use it, such as Ferencváros, Szombathelyi Haladás, and Győr.
The nickname of the club is Atomcsapat (in English "Nuclear Team") which stems from the fact that the only nuclear power in Hungary is based in Paks.

Honours

Leagues
 Nemzeti Bajnokság I
Runners-up (1): 2011
 Nemzeti Bajnokság II
 Winners (1): 2005–06
 Nemzeti Bajnokság III
 Winners (1): 2001

Cups
 Magyar Kupa
 Runners-up (1): 2021–22
 Szabadföld Kupa
 Winners (1): 1976
 Ligakupa
 Winners (1): 2010–11
 Runners-up (1): 2009–10

Current squad

Out on loan

Non-playing staff

Board of directors

Management

Managerial history

 Ferenc Lengyel (July 1, 2004 – Sept 23, 2007)
 Imre Gellei (Aug 28, 2007 – April 12, 2010)
 Károly Kis (April 12, 2010 – Aug 1, 2012)
 Csaba Máté (caretaker) (Aug 1, 2012 – Aug 29, 2012)
  Tomislav Sivić (Aug 30, 2012 – June 1, 2013)
 Ferenc Horvath (June 24, 2013 – Jan 9, 2014)
 Aurél Csertői (Jan 9, 2014 – May 21, 2019)
  Tomislav Sivić (May 27, 2019–3 November 2019)
 Gábor Osztermájer (4 November 2019–21.9.2020)
 György Bognár (21 September - present)
 Róbert Waltner (26 May 2022-)

Seasons

Paksi FC in European competition

Record by country of opposition
Correct as of August 4, 2011

 P – Played; W – Won; D – Drawn; L – Lost

References

External links
Official website (in Hungarian)

 
Football clubs in Hungary
Association football clubs established in 1952
1952 establishments in Hungary
Paksi SE